Thank You Jijaji is a Hindi language Indian comedy series which premiered on 3 August 2009 on SAB TV. The series was produced by Jaspal Bhatti, and starred Jaspal Bhatti and Savita Bhatti.

Cast
Jaspal Bhatti as Jaspal Bhatti/Jijaji 
Savita Bhatti as Preeti (Jaspal's wife)
Gurpreet Ghuggi as S.S. Sidhu (Jaspal's brother-in-law, an IAS Officer)
Rashmi Bedi as Rani (Mr. Sidhu's wife)
Shaurya Bhandari as Mr. Sidhu's son.
Wamiqa Gabbi as Timmi (Mr. Sidhu's daughter)
Deepak Raja as Harpreet aka Harry (Timmi's love interest)
B.N. Sharma as Mr. Bhajan Singh (Harry's father)
Rana Ranbir as Pallu (Mr. Sidhu's servant)
Surinder Farishta as Gulle Shah (The publisher)
Prem Kakaria as Jouranalist (Editor of Daily Chughalkhor newspaper)
Suvinder Vicky as autorickshaw driver

References

Sony SAB original programming
Indian television sitcoms
Indian comedy television series
2009 Indian television series debuts
2009 Indian television series endings